Bas Ek Chance is a 2015 Gujarati film, directed by Kirtan Patel and produced by Kirtan Patel. The film stars Aditya Kapadia and Bhakti Kubavat in the lead roles. Others includes famous actor Rajeev Mehta, Falguni Dave, Mushtaq Khan, Alpesh Dhakan, Mitra Gadhavi. The movie is about a young artist who is trying to get into the movie industry, and waiting for the right break at the right time which will change his life. The movie is about his journey and how amidst finding the right chance he also finds himself. The film was released on 25 September 2015 in India, Muscat, Australia, the US, and Canada.

Cast
 Rajeev Mehta
 Falguni Dave 
 Aditya Kapadia 
 Bhakti Kubavat 
 Mushtaq Khan 
 Alpesh Dhakan 
 Mitra Gadhvi
 Hemang Dave
 Jay Bhatt

Production

Development
The film was produced and directed by Kirtan Patel. Nirav Panchal edited the film.

Filming
The shooting of the film began on 25 January 2015. It took place in parts of Vadodara, including the famous cross-roads Kala Ghoda, Genda Circle, and Chakli Circle.

Casting
Bas Ek Chance stars Rajeev Mehta, Falguni Dave, Aditya Kapadia, Bhakti Kubavat, Mushtaq Khan, Alpesh Dhakan, Mitra Gadhvi, and Hemang Dave.

Soundtrack 
Bas Ek Chance released a soundtrack ranging from love songs to devotional punk. The songs were performed by renowned and critically acclaimed singers including Roop Kumar Rathod, Javed Ali, Parthiv Gohil, Aishwarya Majmudar and Kshitij Banker. The album also contains traditional chants of Raja Ranchhod in a unique rock version, composed and performed by Ahmon Band from Vadodara.

The music of the album Bas Ek Chance was composed by Pranav Mahant, Nikhil Palkhar and Shailesh Solanki. It was released on 12 September 2015 at Vadodara and received a positive response. The music was released worldwide by Movietone Digital Entertainment Pvt Ltd under the label OnClick Music. The music is available across all digital platforms globally.

Release
In August 2015, the producers released the film logo and motion poster. These were well received on social media. The trailer was released on 27 August 2015. The film was premiered at Muscat, Oman on 18 September and later released on 25 September 2015 in India.

 Transmedia Film Awards: Best Film of the Year - 2015 
 Transmedia Film Awards: Best Supporting Role - Rajeev Mehta
 Nominated for: 
 Best producer - Kirtan Patel
 Best direction - Kirtan Patel 
 Best story writer - Kirtan Patel Jaybhatt 
 Best cinematography - Amar Kamble
 Best music composer - Pranav Nikhil Shailesh
 Best actor - Aditya Kapadia
 Best supporting role - Rajeev Mehta 
 Best female supporting role - Falguni Dave, Bhakti Kubavat
 Best singer - Bhargav Pandya
 Best editor - Nirav Panchal

References

External links
 
 Bas Ek Chance website

Indian comedy films
2015 films
Films shot in Gujarat
2010s Gujarati-language films
2015 comedy films